Tomasz Iwański (born 5 December 1968) is a Polish former professional tennis player. A winner of nine national championships, he is head coach of the Polish Tennis Association and formerly coached top-10 player Nadia Petrova.

A native of Łódź, Iwański was runner-up to Wojciech Kowalski at the Polish national championships in 1989, but won four men's doubles championships during his career as well as one mixed doubles title. He was national indoor singles champion in 1991 and a three-time men's doubles indoor champion.

Iwański competed for the Poland Davis Cup team between 1989 to 1994. He helped Poland gain promotion to Europe/Africa Zone Group I in 1990, winning two singles rubbers in the final against Norway. Appearing in a total of 10 ties, he won eight singles and four doubles rubbers for his country.

Challenger titles

Doubles: (1)

See also
List of Poland Davis Cup team representatives

References

External links
 
 
 

1968 births
Living people
Polish male tennis players
Sportspeople from Łódź